Horst Pock (born 6 February 1967 in Klagenfurt) is an Austrian slalom canoeist who competed from the late 1980s to the early 1990s. He finished 12th in the K-1 event at the 1992 Summer Olympics in Barcelona.

References
Sports-Reference.com profile

1967 births
Austrian male canoeists
Canoeists at the 1992 Summer Olympics
Living people
Olympic canoeists of Austria
Sportspeople from Klagenfurt